Shangdongjie Township is a rural township in Sangzhi County, Zhangjiajie, Hunan Province, China.

Administrative division
The township is divided into 11 villages, the following areas: Shangdongjie Village, Libixi Village, Maitaxi Village, Maluo Village, Yuanzi Village, Erhuping Village, Changtangang Village, Dadiping Village, Erhuxi Village, Woyunjie Village, and Fangchangdong Village (上洞街村、利比溪村、麦塔溪村、麻逻村、院子村、二户坪村、长潭岗村、大地坪村、二户溪村、卧云界村、方厂洞村).

References

External links

Divisions of Sangzhi County